XHIMER-FM is a radio station in Mexico City. Broadcasting on 94.5 FM from a tower on Cerro del Chiquihuite, XHIMER is owned by the Instituto Mexicano de la Radio and broadcasts a classical music format under the brand name Opus 94.

History
In the 1970s, the Instituto Politécnico Nacional ceded its rights to 94.5 FM to the Secretariat of Public Education so the SEP could move Radio Educación (XEEP-AM) to FM. However, the money was not available for the SEP to build out the station, and so the proposal was stalled.

The Opus format began on 710 AM (XEMP) in 1983. That same year, 94.5 FM, the last full-power FM frequency available in Mexico City, was put up to attract noncommercial permits. Several groups — the IPN and IMER among them — jockeyed for the station, with IMER winning. Opus moved to the new 94.5 FM on July 4, 1986, when 50 kW transmissions commenced. The station received authorization for a power boost to 100 kW in 1991, but IMER was not able to install a transmitter capable of outputting 100 kW until 1999.

Format
Opus 94 primarily broadcasts classical music. The station broadcasts concerts of the Mexico City Philharmonic Orchestra.

The station broadcasts in HD Radio; this transmission was formally launched on September 17, 2012. Its HD2 signal is co-owned XEB-AM and its HD3 was Jazz Digital, which became silent in mid-2019.

References

Radio stations established in 1986
Radio stations in Mexico City